Diu, also known as Diu Town, is a town in Diu district in the union territory of Dadra and Nagar Haveli and Daman and Diu, India. Diu District is the tenth least populated district of India. The town of Diu lies at the eastern end of Diu Island and is known for its fortress and old Portuguese cathedral. It is a fishing town.

The city is one of the hundred Indian cities competing in a national level competition to get funds under Narendra Modi's flagship Smart Cities Mission. Diu will be competing for one of the last 10 spots against 20 cities from across India. In April 2018, it was reported that the Diu Smart City has already become India's first city to run on 100 percent renewable energy during the daytime.

History 

The town and district were historically part of the Saurashtra region of Gujarat and an important port on trade routes of Arabian sea of Indian Ocean.

Due to its strategic importance, there was a Battle of Diu in 1509 between Portugal and a combined force of Mamluks, Venetians, the Ragusians, the Zamorin of Calicut, and the Sultan of Gujarat, Mahmud Begada. In 1513, the Portuguese tried to establish an outpost, but negotiations were unsuccessful. There were failed attempts by Diogo Lopes de Sequeira in 1521 and Nuno da Cunha in 1523. In 1531 the conquest attempted by D. Nuno da Cunha was unsuccessful.

In 1535 Bahadur Shah, the Sultan of Gujarat, concluded a defensive alliance with the Portuguese against the Mughal emperor Humayun and allowed the Portuguese to construct the Diu Fort and maintain a garrison on the island.

The alliance quickly unravelled, and attempts by the Sultans to oust the Portuguese from Diu between 1537 and 1546 failed. Regretting his generosity, Bahadur Shah sought to recover Diu but was defeated and killed by the Portuguese, followed by a period of war between them and the people of Gujarat. In 1538, Coja Sofar, Lord of Cambay, together with the Ottoman Suleiman Pasha, came to lay siege to Diu and were defeated by Portuguese resistance led by Anthony Silveira. A second siege was imposed by the same Coja Sofar in 1546. It was repelled by the Portuguese conquerors, led on land by D. João Mascarenhas and at sea by D. João de Castro. Coja Sofar and D. Fernando de Castro, son of the Portuguese viceroy, perished in the struggle. The fortress, completed by Dom João de Castro after the siege of 1545, still stands.

After this second siege, Diu was so fortified that it could withstand later attacks of the Arabs of Muscat and the Dutch in the late 17th century. From the 18th century, Diu declined in strategic importance (due to development of Bombay) and was reduced to a museum or historical landmark as a commercial and strategic bulwark in the struggle between the forces of the Islamic East and Christian West.

Diu remained a possession of the Portuguese from 1535 until 1961, when it fell to troops of the Indian Union, who librated all of former Portuguese India under Operation Vijay. The island was occupied by the Indian military on 19 December 1961. The Battle of Diu involved overwhelming land, sea and air strikes on the enclave for 48 hours until the Portuguese garrison there surrendered. It was declared a union territory of India, Goa, Daman, and Diu. Goa separated as a state in 1987; the remainder became union territory of Daman and Diu. On 26 January 2020, the union territories of Daman and Diu were merged with Dadra and Nagar Haveli to form the union territory of Dadra and Nagar Haveli and Daman and Diu.

Population

Languages 
The languages spoken in Diu include Gujarati, Portuguese, English and Hindi.

Demographics 
As of the 2011 Census of India, Diu had a population of  spread over  households. Males constituted 48.4% of the population and females 51.6%. Diu had an average literacy rate of 92%, In Diu, 10% of the population is under 6 years of age.

Geography and climate 

Education
Diu College

Attractions

With no tall buildings except the fort, Diu has a characteristically low skyline.

Diu is mainly known for its white sand beaches. Most famous of the beaches is Nagoa beach. Other beaches are Ghogla, Jallandhar, Chakratirth, and Gomtimata.

Old Diu is known for its Portuguese architecture.

Diu Fort 
Diu Fort was built in 1535 and maintained an active garrison until 1960.

The Diu fort is the most visited landmark in the district. The fort and the Basilica of Bom Jesus in Old Goa were chosen as the two wonders from India, among the seven from across the world, out of a list of 27 monuments built in 16 countries during the Portuguese rule. The fort is built on a hillock next to the sea. There are only remains now, but the fort must have been a very romantic place.

Churches and temples 
There are three Portuguese Baroque churches, with St. Paul’s Church, completed in 1610, being the only one still in use for its intended purpose. The Church of St. Francis of Assisi (the first church built in Diu, in 1593) is now used as a hospital and St. Thomas' Church is used as a museum.

An ancient Lord Shiva temple is on the Gangeswar coast.

Fudam Bird Sanctuary 
Fudam Bird Sanctuary is a large wetland located on Central Diu. The site is home of hundreds of migratory birds. A Birdwatching tower is also located with Forest Office.

Naida Caves 
Naida Caves are near Jalandhar Beach, at 1 km distance from the city centre via Hadmitya Road. Entry to Naida Caves is free. The origin of the caves remains a mystery but it is believed that they were formed either by geological forces or by quarrying done by the Portuguese. Naida Caves create a natural sunlight show which sparkles big orange rocks. A labyrinth-like structure gives it a mesmerising beauty which is a paradise for nature lovers and photographers. The caves are open 24 hours a day, though security personnel may sometimes deny entry at night after 5:30 pm as the insides of the caves become much darker.

Other sites 
INS Khukri or Khukri memorial is near Chakratirth Beach. It is known for its open amphitheater and sunset shots.

There is a dinosaur park with life-sized dinosaur structures and large play area for children right on the bay. Also there is a bird watching sanctuary, a sea shell Museum, a summerhouse and Lovers' Point.

There are several hotels and resorts and there is a growing hotel and leisure industry.

Unlike in Gujarat State, alcohol is legal in Diu. Lot of tourism in Diu from Gujarat is for this reason.

Hoka trees

Another unique specialty of Diu are the Hoka trees (a type of palm tree not found in any other part of India). The trees bear edible fruit.

Transport
Diu is linked to the mainland by a bridge. Local transport is available by road from Una, Gujarat. Alliance Air, an Air India subsidiary, flies from Mumbai, landing at Diu Airport. Jet Airways, also used to have services here till it was bankrupted in 2019.

See also 
 Simbor
 Daman
Nagao Beach

References

Further reading 
 Andrada (undated). The Life of Dom John de Castro: The Fourth Vice Roy of India. Jacinto Freire de Andrada. Translated into English by Peter Wyche. (1664). Henry Herrington, New Exchange, London. Facsimile edition (1994) AES Reprint, New Delhi. .

External links 

 WorldStatesmen, including list of Portuguese governors

 
Cities and towns in Diu district